Vladimir Vasiliyevich Kovalyonok (born 3 March 1942 in Beloye, Minsk Oblast, Belorussian SSR) is a retired Soviet cosmonaut.

He entered the Soviet space programme on July 5, 1967, and was commander of three missions. Together with Aleksandr Ivanchenkov he flew the long-endurance mission EO-2 which set a new record of 139 days in space. He retired from the cosmonaut team on June 23, 1984.

From 1990 to 1992 he was a Director of the 30th Central Scientific Research Institute, Ministry of Defence (Russia).

Missions 
 Soyuz 25
 Soyuz 29/Soyuz 31
 Soyuz T-4
 Salyut 6

Honours and awards 
 Hero of the Soviet Union, twice (2 November 1978 and 26 May 1981)
 Pilot-Cosmonaut of the USSR
 Order of Merit for the Fatherland, 3rd class (16 May 1996)
 Order of Military Merit (2000)
 Three Orders of Lenin (15 November 1977, 2 November 1978 and 26 May 1981)
 Order for Service to the Homeland in the Armed Forces of the USSR, 3rd class (12 August 1991)
 Medal "For Merit in Space Exploration" (12 April 2011) - for great achievements in the field of research, development and use of outer space, many years of diligent work, public activities
 Hero of the German Democratic Republic (1978)
 Order of Karl Marx (East Germany, 1978)
 Hero of the MPR (Mongolia, 1981)
 Order of Sukhbaatar (Mongolia, 1981)
 Cross of Grunwald, 3rd class (Poland, 1978)
 Order for Service to the Homeland, 2nd class (Belarus, 2002)

External links 
 Cosmonaut Biography: Vladimir Kovalyonok
 The official website of the city administration Baikonur - Honorary citizens of Baikonur

1942 births
Living people
People from Krupki District
Soviet cosmonauts
Heroes of the Soviet Union
Recipients of the Order "For Merit to the Fatherland", 3rd class
Recipients of the Order of Military Merit (Russia)
Recipients of the Order of Lenin
Recipients of the Order of the Cross of Grunwald, 3rd class
Soviet Air Force generals
Soviet colonel generals
Recipients of the Medal "For Merit in Space Exploration"
Salyut program cosmonauts
Spacewalkers